Sindhu-Sauvīra was an ancient Indo-Aryan kingdom in the western region of the subcontinent whose existence is attested during the Iron Age in India. The inhabitants of Sindhu were called the Saindhavas, and the inhabitants of Sauvīra were called Sauvīrakas.

Location

The territory of Sindhu-Sauvīra covered the lower Indus Valley, with its southern border being the Indian Ocean and its northern border being the Pañjāb around Multān.

Sindhu was the name of the inland area between the Indus River and the Sulaiman Mountains, while Sauvīra was the name for the coastal part of the kingdom as well as the inland area to the east of the Indus river as far north as the area of modern-day Multan.

The capital of Sindhu-Sauvīra was named Roruka and Vītabhaya or Vītībhaya, and corresponds to the mediaeval Arohṛ and the modern-day Rohṛī.

History

Kingdom
During the 6th to 5th centuries BCE, the Sindhu-Sauvīra was ruled by a powerful king named Udāyana or Udrāyaṇa or Rudrāyaṇa by various sources. Udāyana was married to the princess Prabhāvatī, who was the daughter of Ceṭaka, the consul of the powerful Vajjika League in north-east South Asia, and was herself thus the cousin of the 24th Jain Tīrthaṅkara Mahāvīra, himself the son of Chetaka's sister Trisalā. Ceṭaka had become an adept of the teachings of his nephew Mahāvīra and adopted Jainism, thus making the Licchavika and Vajjika capital of Vesālī a bastion of Jainism, and the marriages of his daughters to various leaders, in turn, contributed to the spreading of Jainism across northern South Asia.

Therefore, according to Jain sources, Udāyana converted to Jainism after hearing Mahāvīra preach at Vītabhya, and he abdicated his throne and became a Jain monk after installing his nephew by his sister, Keśīkumāra, as king of Sindhu-Sauvira, instead of his own son, Abhijitkumāra, who found asylum at the court of Kūṇika, the governor of the Āṅgeya city of Campā for the count of the king of Magadha. However, Buddhist sources instead claim that Udrāyaṇa embraced Buddhism and was ordained by the Buddha.

Persian conquest

Later history
The Sauvīra people or country were mentioned in the Junâgaḍh inscription of Rudradáman.

See also 
Sindhis
History of India
History of Pakistan
Gandhāra (kingdom)

References

External links

Further reading

 

History of Pakistan
History of Sindh
Ancient peoples of Pakistan